Hokejski klub Acroni Jesenice, commonly referred to as HK Acroni Jesenice or simply Jesenice, was a Slovenian ice hockey team from Jesenice that last played in the Austrian Erste Bank Hockey League and the Slovenian Ice Hockey League. They played their home games at the Podmežakla Hall. Throughout its history, the club was regarded as one of the most successful clubs in Slovenian and Yugoslav ice hockey. In September 2012, the club filed for bankruptcy and was dissolved.

History

Before World War II

The club's roots date back to the period before World War II, when enthusiasts started skating on a natural ice surface. The name of Karlo Vergles is mentioned most often with regards to these ice hockey beginnings. In the 1940–41 season, the first amateur team was assembled with simple equipment mostly made in the local steel and iron factory. Despite that, Jesenice team lost their first game to Zagreb with just a one-goal difference.

After World War II
After World War II, ice hockey returned to the Podmežakla Sports Park. In 1948, an ice-hockey/skating section was formed in the local sport society under the leadership of Drago Cerar. The year was also important for the fact that it was the first time that Jesenice played in a proper tournament against Maribor, Brežice and Celje, with Jesenice winning the tournament.

Development of hockey continued in Jesenice in the following years with the opening of the artificial ice hockey surface in 1954, which was the first in former Yugoslavia. The new venue also included a stand for spectators.

In 1956, Jesenice team hired a hockey coach from Czechoslovakia, Zdenek Blaha. In the 1956–57 season, Jesenice won the Yugoslav championship for the first time.

The Golden Age
After winning the 1957 championship, Jesenice completely dominated the Yugoslav League by winning 15 consecutive championship titles. Most coaches in this period were foreigners, coming from Czechoslovakia. Notable players in this period include Albin Felc, Dušan Brun, Bogo Jan, Ciril Klinar, Viktor Tišler, Vlado Jug, Gorazd Hiti, Franc Smolej, and Rudi Knez.

After the 1971 season, the Yugoslav championship was more or less divided equally between Jesenice and Olimpija. Jesenice have won the league in 1972–73, 1976–77, 1977–78, 1980–81, 1981–82, 1984–85, 1986–87, and 1987–88. Jesenice have also won the 1974 championship, but the title was later taken away from them by the ice hockey federation. Notable about this period is that the majority of players came from Jesenice or neighboring cities.

After the Slovenian independence (1991 to 2012) 

First years after the Slovenian independence were again dominated by the Jesenice team. Alongside local players, the team was reinforced by players from the former Soviet Union under the coaching of Vladimir Krikunov. This resulted in three consecutive championship titles. However, financial and staff problems brought the team to the brink of collapse. The peak of these troubles was the exclusion of Jesenice team from the Slovenian championships in the 1998–99 season.

It took a couple of years for Jesenice to bounce back and in the 2004–05 season, with the arrival of four players from Olimpija, Jesenice won the championship for the first time in over ten years.

in 2006, Jesenice were invited as the first non-Austrian team to play in the expanded Austrian ice hockey championships. From 2006 and until 2012 the club has also won four more Slovenian titles (2008, 2009, 2010, and 2011).

Bankruptcy and dissolution
The club had accumulated debt, reportedly near €2.5 million, at the conclusion of the 2011–12 EBEL season, and was eventually expelled from the league. On 31 August 2012, HK Acroni Jesenice filed for bankruptcy and were dissolved. Their affiliate HD Mladi Jesenice were registered and run separately from the main squad.

Arena
The team played their home matches at the Podmežakla Hall, a 4,500 capacity multi-purpose indoor hall in Jesenice.

Honours

Yugoslav Ice Hockey League
Winners (23): 1956–57 – 1970–71, 1972–73, 1976–77, 1977–78, 1980–81, 1981–82, 1984–85, 1986–87, 1987–88
Runners-up (13): 1953–54, 1955–56, 1971–72, 1973–74, 1974–75, 1975–76, 1978–79, 1979–80, 1982–83, 1983–84, 1985–86, 1988–89, 1989–90

Yugoslav Ice Hockey Cup
Winners (8): 1967, 1968, 1970, 1971, 1973, 1974, 1976, 1977

Slovenian Championship
Winners (9): 1991–92, 1992–93, 1993–94, 2004–05, 2005–06, 2007–08, 2008–09, 2009–10, 2010–11
Runners-up (9): 1994–95, 1995–96, 1996–97, 1997–98, 1999–2000, 2000–01, 2001–02, 2002–03, 2011–12

Interliga
Winners (2): 2004–05, 2005–06

Rudi Hiti Summer League
Winners (6): 1992, 1993, 2005, 2006, 2009, 2011

Coaches

Players

Notable players

Slovenia
 Anže Kopitar (Jesenice youth team)

References

1948 establishments in Slovenia
2012 disestablishments in Slovenia
Alpenliga teams
Defunct ice hockey teams in Slovenia
Former Austrian Hockey League teams
Interliga (1999–2007) teams
Slovenian Ice Hockey League teams
Sport in Jesenice, Jesenice
Ice hockey clubs established in 1948
Ice hockey clubs disestablished in 2012
Yugoslav Ice Hockey League teams